Anthony Cavalcante (February 6, 1897 – October 29, 1966) was a United States Representative for Pennsylvania.

Anthony Cavalcante was born in Vanderbilt, Pennsylvania. He served overseas with Company D, One Hundred and Tenth Infantry, Twenty-eighth Division, from May 3, 1918, to May 6, 1919, and was awarded the Purple Heart. He was a student at Bucknell University in Lewisburg, Pennsylvania, in 1920 and 1921 and Penn State College in 1921.

He graduated from the law school of Dickinson College in Carlisle, Pennsylvania, in 1924. He was a member of the Pennsylvania State Senate from 1935 to 1943. He worked as chief counsel for United Mine Workers of America, District Four of German Township School District, German Township Road Supervisors, and South Union Township Road Supervisors.

Cavalcante was elected as a Democrat to the 81st Congress in 1948, defeating incumbent Republican Congressman William J. Crow. He was an unsuccessful candidate for reelection in 1950, defeated by Republican Edward L. Sittler. After his time in Congress he was engaged in the practice of law, and died in Uniontown, Pennsylvania, aged 69.

References
The Political Graveyard
 Retrieved on 2008-02-15

1897 births
1966 deaths
United States Army soldiers
United States Army personnel of World War I
Democratic Party Pennsylvania state senators
People from Uniontown, Pennsylvania
Pennsylvania lawyers
Military personnel from Pennsylvania
Dickinson College alumni
United Mine Workers people
Democratic Party members of the United States House of Representatives from Pennsylvania
20th-century American politicians
20th-century American lawyers